A leadership election of the Australian Labor Party (ALP), then the opposition party in the Parliament of Australia, was held on 22 December 1977. Following the resignation of Gough Whitlam former Treasurer Bill Hayden was elected Labor's new leader winning 36 votes to 28 over Lionel Bowen who was then elected deputy leader.

Background
After losing the 1977 election Gough Whitlam finally resigned as party leader after more than 10 years.

Bill Hayden who in May had come within two votes of toppling Whitlam, announced the day after election that he would contest the leadership.

Candidates
 Lionel Bowen, Shadow Attorney-General, Member for Kingsford Smith
 Bill Hayden, Shadow Minister for Economic Management, Member for Oxley

Results

Leadership ballot
The following tables gives the ballot results:

Deputy leadership ballot

Paul Keating had previously announced that he would stand for the deputy leadership, however he stood aside in favour of Bowen.

Aftermath
Hayden led the party in on the 1980 election where they managed to halve Malcolm Fraser's majority.

References

Australian Labor Party leadership spills
December 1977 events in Australia
1977 elections in Australia
Australian Labor Party leadership election